War of Ages (sometimes abbreviated WoA; formerly known as Point Zero) is an American Christian metal band formed in Erie, Pennsylvania, in 2002.

The band's self-titled debut album War of Ages was released in 2005, and in February 2006, they were moved to the Facedown Records roster and recorded their second full-length album, Pride of the Wicked, released in September 2006. Arise and Conquer was released in 2008. The band's fifth offering Eternal, was released in 2010. Their seventh studio album Supreme Chaos was released in 2014. Their eighth studio album Alpha was released in 2017, their ninth album, Void, 2019.

History
War of Ages began in 2002, originally as Point Zero. The band recorded their debut EP, Unite Us All. Shortly after this release, the band switched names to War of Ages and signed with Strike First Records. The band connected with the label via their friends in xDISCIPLEx A.D., who were also from Erie, Pennsylvania. 

The band would record a self-titled debut, which was released by Strike First Records in July 2005. However, Kang Garnic replaced Moore during this time on guitars. In 2006, the band released their sophomore album, Pride of the Wicked, adding on former Mortal Treason bassist TJ Alford, Hamp's brother Alex Hamp on drums, and rhythm guitarist Johnathan Lynch.

In 2007, the band released their third album, Fire from the Tomb, which was a re-recording of many of their debut album's tracks. The band went into Cathouse Studios and began recording the album. Arise and Conquer was released in 2008, with Branon Bernatowicz joining the band as rhythm guitarist. Following Arise and Conquer, the band began working with As I Lay Dying vocalist Tim Lambesis to produce their next album, Eternal, which would feature Lambesis on guest vocals, as well as Josh Gilbert and Sonny Sandoval. The album was released in April 2010. It was written to stand out and was an emotional release. The album was very well received, becoming the first to rank on the Billboard charts. In 2012, the band released their sixth studio album, Return to Life. Following in the footsteps of Eternal, the album ranked on the Billboard, but some reviewers did not enjoy the album as much.

In July 2014, the band released their seventh album, Supreme Chaos, which saw the induction of the newest member, Hope for the Dying's Jack Daniels on rhythm guitars. With Daniels addition, the band added a very European style. The album would also rank on the Billboard charts, ranking at 107 on the Billboard 200, 37 on Billboard Rock charts, 14 on Hard Rock charts, 5 on the Christian charts, and 24 on the Independent albums charts.

In December 2017, the band released their eighth album, Alpha, with the lineup of Hamp, Daniels, Brown, and a session drummer, Alex Rüdinger, who also worked with The Faceless and 7 Horns 7 Eyes. In September 2019, the band released their ninth studio album, Void, alongside several singles. The album would also be the debut for The Burial members Elisha Mullins on bass and Kaleb Luebchow on drums.
On June 25, 2021, War of Ages released a new single, "No Altars". On September 24, the band released another single, "Pyrite", and also announced the release of a new EP, Rhema, on October 29.

On July 29, 2022, the band announced that drummer Kaleb Luebchow passed away two days prior, without specifying the cause of death.

Christianity
The band is known for their strong Christian faith which is expressed in their lyrics. In a 2009 radio interview with The Full Armor of God Broadcast, Leroy Hamp professed that as Christians the band wants to "Make a difference in a world that's covered in darkness."

Band members

Current members
 Leroy Hamp – lead vocals (2002–present)
 Steve Brown – lead guitar (2002–present)
 Elisha Mullins – bass (2012, 2018–present)
 Jack Daniels –  rhythm guitar (2013–present)

Session musicians
 Alex Rüdinger – drums (2017)

Former members
 Nate Owensby – bass (2002–2005)
 Rob Kerner – drums (2002–2005)
 Matt Moore – rhythm guitar (2002–2004)
 Kang Garnic – rhythm guitar (2004–2005)
 Alex Hamp – drums (2005–2017)
 T.J. Alford – bass, backing vocals (2005–2012)
 Luke Johnathan Lynch – rhythm guitar, backing vocals (2005–2008)
 Branon Bernatowicz – rhythm guitar (2006–2012), bass  (2016–2017)
 Mark Randazzo – rhythm guitar, backing vocals (2012–2013)
 Ryan Tidwell – bass, backing vocals (2013–2014)
 Brendan Hengle – bass (2014–2016)
 Kaleb Luebchow – drums (2017–2022) (died 2022)

Timeline

Discography

Studio albums

EPs
 Unite Us All (2004) (independent EP)
 Rhema (2021) (Facedown Records)
Music videos
 "Stand Your Ground" (directed by: Facedown Records)
 "Strength Within" (directed by: Facedown Records) 
 "Through the Flames" (directed by: Andy Reale)
 "All Consuming Fire" (directed by: Andy Reale)
 "Collapse" (directed by: Drew Russ)
 "Silent Night" (directed by: DJ Cosgrove)
 "Redeemer" (lyric video)
 "From Ashes" (directed by: Matt Spencer)
 "Chaos Theory" (directed by: Matt Spencer)
 "Lionheart" (directed by: Matt Spencer)
 "Creator" (directed by: Matt Spencer)
 "Miles Apart" (directed by: Matt Spencer)

References

External links
 
 War of Ages at Facedown Records
 War of Ages interview with Leroy Hamp
 Leroy Hamp of War of Ages
 War of Ages Frontman Leroy Hamp Talks Christians in a band vs Christian band
 War of Ages on Lambgoat

Musical groups from Pennsylvania
Metalcore musical groups from Pennsylvania
Musical groups established in 2002
American Christian metal musical groups
2002 establishments in Pennsylvania
Facedown Records artists
Strike First Records artists